Iphionidae is a family of polychaetes belonging to the order Phyllodocida.

Genera:
 Iphione Kinberg, 1856
 Iphionella McIntosh, 1885
 Iphionides Hartmann-Schröder, 1977
 Thermiphione Hartmann-Schröder, 1992

References

Polychaetes